Sifan Hassan (born 1 January 1993) is an Ethiopian-born Dutch middle- and long-distance runner. She completed an unprecedented triple at the 2020 Tokyo Olympics winning gold medals in both the 5000 metres and 10,000 metres, and a bronze medal for the 1500 metres. Hassan is the only athlete in Olympic history to win medals across a middle-distance event and both long-distance races in a single Games. She is only the second woman to complete an Olympic distance double.

At the World Athletics Championships, Hassan took 1500m and 10,000m titles in 2019, becoming the only athlete (male or female) in history to win both these events at a single World Championships or Olympic Games. She won a bronze at the 1500m in 2015, and at the 5000m in 2017 when she also finished fifth for the 1500m. Hassan is a three-time World Indoor Championships medallist, winning gold at 1500m in 2016 as well as silver at 3000m and bronze for 1500m in 2018. She earned six European medals (including two cross country titles), and one European indoor medal. She is also a three-time Diamond League winner, having secured the 1500m/5000m double in 2019.

Hassan is the world record holder for both the one mile and 5 km road race, both set in 2019, as well as the one hour run, set in 2020. She held a world record at 10,000 m for two days in June 2021. She owns five European records (1500m, 3000m, 5000m, 10,000m, half marathon) and three Dutch records.

Early life
Sifan Hassan was born in Adama, Oromia, Ethiopia and raised in the countryside of Kersa in the Munesa district of the Arsi Zone of Oromia. She was a recreational runner there. She left Ethiopia as a refugee and arrived in the Netherlands in 2008 at age fifteen. She began running while undertaking studies to become a nurse. Hassan became a Dutch citizen in 2013.

Career

2011–2012
Affiliated with Eindhoven Atletiek, Hassan entered the Eindhoven half marathon in 2011 and won the race with a time of 77:10 minutes. She was also runner-up at two cross country races (Sylvestercross and Mol Lotto Cross Cup). She won those races in 2012, as well as the 3000 m at the Leiden Gouden Spike meet.

2013–2014
Hassan made her breakthrough in the 2013 season. She ran an 800 metres best of 2:00.86 minutes to win at the KBC Night of Athletics and took wins in the 1500 m at the Nijmegen Global Athletics and Golden Spike Ostrava meets. On the 2013 IAAF Diamond League circuit she was runner-up in the 1500 m at Athletissima with a personal best of 4:03.73 minutes and was third at the DN Galan 3000 m with a best of 8:32.53 minutes – this time ranked her the fourth fastest runner in the world that year.

Hassan became a Dutch citizen in November 2013, too late for competing at the 2013 World Championships, and the following month she made her first appearance for the Netherlands. At the 2013 European Cross Country Championships she won the gold medal in the under-23 category and helped the Dutch team to third in the rankings. She also won the Warandeloop and Lotto Cross Cup Brussels races that winter.

At the beginning of 2014 she ran a world leading time of 8:45.32 minutes for the 3000 m at the Weltklasse in Karlsruhe, then broke the Dutch record in the indoor 1500 m with a time of 4:05.34 minutes at the Birmingham Indoor Grand Prix.

2015
At the 2015 World Championships in Beijing, Hassan won the bronze medal in the 1500 meters. She became the second female Dutch athlete ever to win a medal at the World Championships, after Dafne Schippers. She was the third female Dutch winner at the 2015 European Cross Country Championships, following in the footsteps of fellow African migrants Hilda Kibet and Lornah Kiplagat.

2016–2017
Hassan won her heat in the 1500 m in the 2016 Summer Olympics in 4:06.64 before Faith Kipyegon. In the semifinals she placed second in 4:03.62 after Genzebe Dibaba who won in 4:03.06. In the final Kipyegon took the Olympic gold medal with 4:08.92, Dibaba was the runner up with 4:10.27 and Jennifer Simpson took the bronze medal in 4:10.53. Hassan placed fifth in a time of 4:11.23.

She finished fifth  in the 1500 m at the 2017 World Athletics Championships and won the bronze medal in the 5000 metres event.

2018
On 13 July, she broke the European record for 5000 metres by finishing second at the Rabat Diamond League in 14:22.34. A few days later, Hassan won the first Millicent Fawcett Mile at the 2018 London Anniversary Games in a time of 4:14.71, the fourth fastest result at the time.

At the 2018 European Championships, she won a gold medal in the 5000 m with the time 14:46:12, setting the new championships record.

On 16 September, she broke the European record for the half marathon with a time of 65:15, winning the Copenhagen half marathon

2019
On 17 February, Hassan set the world record for a 5 km road race stopping the clock at 14m 44s in Monaco. The 5 km road race has been a world record event since 1 November 2017. At the Prefontaine Classic in June, she broke a European 3000m record with a time of 8m 18.49s.

Mile world record
On 12 July, Hassan entered the mile run at the Herculis meet in Fontvieille, Monaco. Olha Lyakhova was the pace setter, taking the field through the first two laps (measured at the start line, not the quarter-mile splits) in 64.26 and 63.94 (2:08.20). As is typical for Hassan, she was last off the start line, but over the next 150 metres, slowly eased herself around the field on the outside into the marking position behind Lyakhova. Gabriela DeBues-Stafford soon moved through the field in between Hassan and Lyakhova for the next lap before Hassan and Gudaf Tsegay separated from the field as the only chasers. Between 800 and 1000 metres, Lyakhova strained to keep on pace, but Hassan and Tsegay were moving forward. After Lyakhova stepped out, the two found themselves 15 metres ahead of the pack. At 1200 metres, Hassan was looking back at her close chaser Tsegay in 3:10.13 (a 61.93 lap). Hassan accelerated, opening a 5-metre gap over the next 100 metres. Continuing at this pace, she passed 1500 metres in about 3:55. Hassan covered the last 409.344 metres in 62.20, her final time of 4:12:33 breaking Svetlana Masterkova's almost 23-year-old world record. The athletes trailing Hassan rewrote the all-time top 25 list, with Laura Weightman moving into position #15, DeBues-Stafford into #17, and after #5 all-time Tsegay faded into the pack she was followed by Rababe Arafi, Axumawit Embaye, Winnie Nanyondo and Ciara Mageean moving into positions #20–23.

She was the double 2019 Diamond League champion, winning both the 1500 and 5000 metres Trophies.

On 28 September, she became the 2019 World Champion in the 10,000 metres in her second race for that distance. Her first race at the event was in Stanford in a time of 31:18.12, just fast enough to achieve the qualifying standard for the World Championships. The winning time of 30:17.62 was the best time of the year on the track. Alina Reh (Germany) led the field after 3000 metres in 9:29.69. The front runner reached the halfway point in 15:32.70. Letesenbet Gidey finished in 30:21.23, with Agnes Tirop (Kenya) coming in third place in 30:25.50. The second half of the run was covered in 14:45. Hassan also won the 1500 metres race with a time of 3:51.95 (sixth place on the 1500 m all-time-list), setting a new Championships and European record. The second-placed finisher was Faith Kipyegon in 3:54.22, a new Kenyan national record, and the third place went to Gudaf Tsegay with 3:54.38.

2020–2021
On 10 October, Hassan set a European record for the women's 10,000 metres in a time of 29:36.67, breaking mark set by Great Britain's Paula Radcliffe in 2002 by more than 24 seconds.

On 6 June 2021, she bettered her performance at the event to set a world record of 29m 06.82s in Hengelo, beating 2016 record of Ethiopian Almaz Ayana by more than 10 seconds. Hassan lost the record two days later, however, when Ethiopia's Letesenbet Gidey achieved a time of 29m 01.03s at the same stadium. 

Hassan won gold in the 5000 metres and 10,000 metres at the delayed 2020 Tokyo Olympic Games. She also won bronze in the 1500 metres. She became the only athlete ever to medal in the 1500, 5000, and 10,000 metres events at the same Olympics. Her 5000m winning time was 14:36.79 ahead of Hellen Obiri from Kenya with 14:38.36, while Gudaf Tsegay from Ethiopia won a bronze medal in a time of 14:38.87. Her gold medal win made her the first Dutch woman with an Olympic athletics medal in a long-distance event. She was the first non-Kenyan or Ethiopian athlete to win the event since Gabriela Szabo won in the 2000 Sydney Olympics.

2022
This season was worse for Hassan as competing at the World Championships in Eugene, Oregon she finished sixth in the 5000 metres and fourth in the 10,000 metres.

Coach
Beginning in 2016, Hassan was coached by Alberto Salazar at the Nike Oregon Project. In 2019 Salazar began serving a four-year ban from athletics for doping violations dating from before he started coaching Hassan. In 2021 he was suspended for life by the United States Center for SafeSport for sexual misconduct.

Hassan's current coach is Tim Rowberry who began coaching her in July 2018. Rowberry was also the coach of runner Yomif Kejelcha, Hassan's training partner until his recent departure to Adidas.

Achievements

Information from World Athletics profile unless otherwise noted.

Personal bests

International competitions

Circuit wins and titles
  Diamond League Overall 1500 m winner: 2015
  Diamond League 1500 m champion: 2019
  Diamond League 5000 m champion: 2019
 2014 (2) 1500 m: Paris Meeting Areva, Glasgow Grand Prix
 2015 (2) 1500 m: Birmingham British Grand Prix, Lausanne Athletissima
 2017 [3]; (2) 1500 m: Rome Golden Gala, Meeting de Paris; (1) 3000 m: Birmingham British Grand Prix
 2018 [2]; (1) One mile: London Anniversary Games; (1) 1500 m: Birmingham British Grand Prix
 2019 [4]; (1) 3000 m: Palo Alto Prefontaine Classic; (1) One mile: Monaco Herculis; (1) 1500 m: Zürich Weltklasse; (1) 5000 m: Brussels Memorial Van Damme
 2020 (1) One hour: Brussels Memorial Van Damme
 2021 [3]; (1) 1500 m: Rome Golden Gala in Florence; (1) 5000 m: Eugene Prefontaine Classic; (1) One mile: Brussels Memorial Van Damme
 2022 (1) 3000 m: Chorzów Kamila Skolimowska Memorial

National titles
 Dutch Indoor Athletics Championships
 800 metres: 2016
 1500 metres: 2015

References

External links

 

1993 births
World Athletics Championships winners
Diamond League winners
IAAF Continental Cup winners
World Athletics Indoor Championships winners
World Athletics Championships medalists
European Athletics Championships medalists
European Cross Country Championships winners
Athletes (track and field) at the 2016 Summer Olympics
World Athletics Championships athletes for the Netherlands
Olympic athletes of the Netherlands
Dutch female long-distance runners
Dutch female middle-distance runners
Ethiopian female long-distance runners
Ethiopian female middle-distance runners
Dutch female cross country runners
Ethiopian female cross country runners
Dutch people of Ethiopian descent
Ethiopian emigrants to the Netherlands
Living people
Sportspeople from Oromia Region
Oromo people
Athletes (track and field) at the 2020 Summer Olympics
Medalists at the 2020 Summer Olympics
Olympic gold medalists for the Netherlands
Olympic gold medalists in athletics (track and field)
Olympic bronze medalists for the Netherlands
Olympic bronze medalists in athletics (track and field)